Fedra is an opera in three acts composed by Ildebrando Pizzetti to an Italian-language libretto which he abridged from the text of Gabriele D'Annunzio's 1909 tragedy of the same name.  The play and the opera recount the story of the Greek mythological figure Phaedra and her unrequited love for her stepson Hippolytus. It premiered on 20 March 1915 at La Scala in Milan conducted by Gino Marinuzzi.

Roles

Synopsis
The Prelude opens with an extended melody for violas, reflecting Fedra’s passionate desire for Ippolito.

Fedra conceives an insane irresistible passion for her stepson, Ippolito, born of a previous relationship of her husband with the queen of Amazons. 

She tries to kiss Ippolito when he's sleeping. Ippolito is awakened by the kiss and they have a fight. He rejects her love for him and makes it very clear to her that he is not interested. Fedra is distraught by the passion of love, but at the same time, is furious at having been rejected by him. She conceives a feeling of hatred so strong as to make her want revenge.

Teseo arrives at the palace just in time to see the son flee, without answering his father who had called him repeatedly. Fedra claimed Ippolito had raped her. Teseo, at first, thinks that his wife's accusation against his son may be a lie, but when Fedra provides him with the proof, Teseo, who is blinded by anger, invokes Poseidon to have Ippolito die on that same day.

Ippolito loses his life that very day near the sea as a result of an accident. He fell from his horse and his head hit against a rock. When Teseo finds out the truth of the accusation, he throws himself against Fedra, announcing her death among cruel torments.

Recordings

References

Operas by Ildebrando Pizzetti
Italian-language operas
1915 operas
Operas
Operas based on works by Gabriele D'Annunzio
Opera world premieres at La Scala
Phaedra
Theseus
Works based on Hippolytus (play)